The Great St Bernard Pass is the third highest road pass in Switzerland, at an elevation of . It connects Martigny in the canton of Valais in Switzerland with Aosta in the region Aosta Valley in Italy. It is the lowest pass lying on the ridge between the two highest mountains of the Alps, Mont Blanc and Monte Rosa. It is located on the main watershed that separates the basin of the Rhône from that of the Po.

Great St Bernard is one of  the most ancient passes through the Western Alps, with evidence of use as far back as the Bronze Age and surviving traces of a Roman road. In 1800, Napoleon's army used the pass to enter Italy, an event depicted in Jacques-Louis David's Napoleon at the Saint-Bernard Pass and Hippolyte Delaroche's Bonaparte Crossing the Alps, both notable oil paintings. Having been bypassed by easier and more practical routes, particularly the Great St Bernard Tunnel, a road tunnel which opened in 1964, its value today is mainly historical and recreational.

Straddling the highest point of the road, the Great St Bernard Hospice was founded in 1049. The hospice later became famous for its use of St Bernard dogs in rescue operations. The Italian side of the area includes several facilities as well. Between them is the small Great St Bernard Lake.

Geography

The Great St Bernard Pass is located near the western end of the Valais Alps, the next pass to the west, Col Ferret, marking the transition with the Mont Blanc massif. In that area, between Mont Dolent and Mont Vélan, the main crest of the Alps barely reaches 3,000 metres, unlike in the much higher section of the Valais Alps east of Mont Vélan and Grand Combin. Therefore, the Great St Bernard Pass is one of the only two road axis connecting Valais with northern Italy, the other axis being the Simplon Pass.

Route
The road running through the pass, highway E27 in both Italy and Switzerland, joins Martigny on the upper Rhône in the canton of Valais, Switzerland, to Aosta in the Aosta Valley region of Italy. From Martigny Route 9 descends to Lausanne and from Aosta Route A5 descends to Torino.

From the north, in Switzerland, the route to the pass follows the lower part of the river Drance above Martigny, then into the sparsely populated Val d'Entremont (lit.: "valley between mountain") through which the Drance d'Entremont flows. After having passed the last inhabited locality, Bourg-Saint-Pierre, the road runs above a large reservoir, the Lac des Toules. At the location of Bourg-Saint-Bernard, the Great St Bernard Tunnel (and the main road) plunges through the mountains at a  level, reducing, since the tunnel's opening in 1964, the commercial relevance of the road over the pass. The summit section of the road consists of hairpin turns before it reaches the top of the pass, after having passed the Combe des Morts.

On the south side the route descends a few metres and reaches the shores of the lake before its enters Italy. Then the route follows the steep slopes of the upper part of the torrent du Grand Saint-Bernard to the south, then turns to the east and follows the river in a bend to the south, where the mountain river enters the torrent Artanavaz near Saint-Rhémy-en-Bosses and turns to the east again, then smoothly to the southeast at La Clusaz (Gignod). Here the river enters the Buthier river in the lower end of the Valpelline valley and turns south again on which end finally the river flows into the Dora Baltea near the Pont de Pierre in Aosta. The route here in the main valley of the Val d'Aoste becomes part of the A5 motorway connecting the Mont Blanc Tunnel to the west and the upper Po Basin to the southeast.

A reduction of utility began after the construction of the Simplon Tunnel, strictly a railway tunnel,  to the east in 1905. The much smaller historic road winding over the pass itself, which lies a few hundred metres from the Swiss border with Italy, is only passable June to September.

The Tour de France has visited the pass five times. It was climbed four times as a 1st category climb, and one time, in 2009, as a hors catégorie climb.

Weather
The snow in the pass in winter may be as much as 10 metres deep. The temperature may drop as low as -30 °C.  The lake in the pass is frozen for 265 days per year. A summary of weather data for the year 1991-2020 is given below.

Ecology
The pass is well above the tree line. All the wood required for construction and firewood must be hauled in from some distance. On the south-west side of the pass is a small tarn, the Great St Bernard Lake, which captures melt water and does not support fish, even though attempts have been made to stock it. In past years the tarn has not always thawed completely in summer.

Alpine flowers are abundant in the vicinity: Gentiana clusii, Ranunculus glacialis, Dryas octopetala, Forget-me-not, Saxifraga oppositifolia among many hundreds more. Moss is prolific and the rocks are lichen-covered.

The hospice and the dogs

A hospice for travellers was founded in 1049 by Saint Bernard of Menthon and came to be named after him in the 16th century, along with the pass. It was not the first hospice in the pass. Buildings were probably there since the Roman mansio, but the region was not secure and they were destroyed many times. The first concern of the founder of the current monastery was to clear the region of bandits and keep the pass safe for travellers, the role of rescuers developing naturally. The hospice later became famous for its use of St Bernard dogs in rescue operations. Pope Pius XI confirmed Bernard as patron saint of the Alps in 1923.

The hospice straddles the highest point of the road, which is in Switzerland. Today the modern road for through traffic has been routed around the outside of the monastery buildings to allow some integrity of the grounds. The old road may still be seen, above the paved road. The hospice occupies two buildings, of 1560 and 1898 (picture, above). The Congregation of Canons of the Great Saint Bernard (the monks) also owns the Hôtel de l'Hospice du Grand-St-Bernard, a four-storey building made of grey stone (built in 1899) on the Italian side, which it leases to a private entrepreneur for the provision of hotel services.

The St Bernards were bred large enough to traverse deep snow and to find lost persons by scent. The first evidence that the dogs were in use at the monastery is two paintings dating to 1690 by  Salvator Rosa. It is often said that they carried small casks of  brandy around their necks (although this is only legend), in the belief that the liquor had medicinal properties.

A description of an overnight stay at the monastery in 1857 was given by Theodore Nielsen, a Danish kleinsmith journeyman, in his memoirs: 

Today the tunnel and modern technology have made rescue operations at the pass mainly unnecessary. The dogs were put up for sale in 2004 because of the high cost of maintenance and were promptly bought by two foundations created for the purpose: Fondation Barry du Grand Saint Bernard (major contributor Christine Cerletti-Sarasin) and Fondation Bernard et Caroline de Watteville. Barry bought the kennels and the facilities in Martigny and continues to support and breed the dogs (three or four dozen). One condition of the sale is that they be brought to the monastery for the summer. Travellers are likely to see them romping around the slopes. The de Watteville Foundation keeps several dogs in kennels adjunct to its Musée. Both have agreed to work together and others have joined the partnership.

The monastery currently houses a handful of monks on a permanent basis, and serves as a spiritual centre for others on retreat.

History

Celtic period
The pass first appears in history as the route taken by the Celtic tribes of the Boii and Lingones in the invasion of Italy of 390 BC. The classical authors first mentioning the pass in that or other contexts lived the 1st century BC under the early Roman empire. They were calling the pass and the mountains Poeninus or Poenini, "Punic", an apparent reference to Hannibal's crossing. He did not cross there, however. On the presumption that the name was falsely altered by analogy, it can be reconstructed to *peninus, a Roman-Celtic word, considering that Celtic tribes owned the entire pass until defeated by the Romans. Livy says that the pass was not named after the Carthaginians but after a mountain god. For well over a century scholars such as the Grimm brothers have made a connection with continental Celtic pen or ben, "head, summit, chief" on an analogy with the Zeus karaios of Hesychius.

Two tribes occupied the valleys on either side of the pass on a permanent basis: the Veragri on the Swiss side and the Salassi on the Italian side.

Roman period
Julius Caesar sent an expedition under his best commander, Servius Galba, from Gaul in 57 BC to seize the pass, hoping to obtain a shorter route between Italy and Gaul than the contemporaneous coastal route. Galba was deceived by the Veragri into making camp near Martigny with the expectation of moving into the pass on the next day. At that time the Romans found the heights over the trail occupied by three hostile Gallic tribes. The Romans won a local victory by a daring foray from the camp but Galba judged he could not take the pass and departed.

Augustus succeeded where his adoptive father failed and the pass became Roman. Augustus placed a large castra stativa and colony, Augusta Praetoria Salassorum, below the pass, which became Aosta (contraction of Augusta). Its ruins are a historic attraction there. By 43 AD under the emperor Claudius a good Roman road through the pass was completed with a mansio at the top and a temple to Jupiter Poeninus, resulting in the name Mons Jovis in late antiquity, Monte Jove in the early Italian period and Mont Joux in the French period, a synonym for the pass. The site of the temple is known as the Plan de Jupiter, located on a knoll on the Italian side of the pass. A cross was placed there in 1816 bearing the inscription Deo optimo maximo, "to the best and greatest god." The bronze statue of St Bernard on a pedestal above the road on the Italian side, across a small valley from the cross, was constructed in 1905 on the site of the Roman mansio.

The coins and votive tablets found at the site of the temple roughly date the upper limit of Roman control of the pass. The youngest date to the reign of Theodosius II (1st half of the 5th century). These and other artifacts are stored in the monastery museum. Fragments of the marble temple, some with inscriptions, have been incorporated into many structures of the village of Bourg-Saint-Pierre on the Swiss side of the pass. The Roman milestone for mile XXIIII was also brought to the center of the settlement from the top of the pass.

Napoleonic crossing

The pass had entered history with the Gallic invasion of 390 BC. The last Gallic invasion over it occurred in May, 1800, under the direction of the 30-year-old First Consul of the French Republic, Napoleon Bonaparte. An Austrian army of 140,000 men had laid siege to French-occupied Genoa on the west coast of northern Italy. Napoleon traversed the pass with 40,000 men and ⅓ of their heavy artillery sending another 20,000 over three other passes as a diversion, intending to strike the Austrian rear. The panicked Austrians were unable to assemble fast enough to meet the French en masse but rather in a piecemeal way in June 1800, and so were defeated first at the Battle of Montebello and then at the Battle of Marengo.

Napoleon prepared for the march secretly by assembling men in small units below the pass, establishing supply dumps along the lower part of their route, and hiring artisans to set up shop along it as well. On May 15 an advance unit went over the pass to take Aosta, after which hospitals were set up at Martigny and Aosta. At Martigny the army assembled and received rations for three days. All the equipment - carriages, artillery, arms and ammunition - was disassembled and divided into packs of 60-70 pounds for the men to carry. The cannons were to be dragged up over the snow in hollowed-out pine half-logs by mules, and then when the mules died or were exhausted, by 100 soldiers and hired men each. Napoleon offered liberal monetary rewards to soldiers and laborers who could perform difficult portages in a timely fashion.

Over several days at the end of May the army went over the pass single-file, 6000 men per day. Bands played martial music along the route, with drum rolls at especially difficult places to alert the men. At the top the monks handed each man two glasses of wine and a slice of rye with cheese as he filed by (courtesy of the French army). Accounts of the amounts expended vary. On the other side the snow became so packed that the men slid down sitting. Napoleon was the last man over, sliding also. The good weather held for the entire crossing, which could easily have turned into a disaster, if it had not.

On the way up Napoleon had discussed affairs of the heart with his young guide and mule driver, Pierre Nicholas Dorsaz, who did not know his identity. Offered a reward at the top, Dorsaz asked for the mule on which Napoleon was riding. He received the mule and a short note for the chief supply officer of the army. Versions of the story vary, but they all agree that when the young man had turned in the note and had drawn his ample pay for the work, he found that his companion was Napoleon and the latter had given him a house and farm so that he could marry his sweetheart.

In the Aosta Valley Napoleon's army slipped by an Austrian garrison at Bard just out of cannon range. The commander related that he was astonished to watch an army of 40,000 men in full equipment go marching past from the direction of the heights.

In literature
The Dorrit family crossed from France into Italy in Book Two: Riches of the novel Little Dorrit by Charles Dickens. They meet the newly-wed Gowans and the gentlemanly murderer Rigaud, now called Blandois, at the inn after climbing up on mules. The novel was published in 1857, but set in the mid 1820s. Dickens describes the sites of the pass, and the experience of staying overnight in the inn, having visited it in person.

See also

 List of highest paved roads in Europe
 List of mountain passes
 List of the highest Swiss passes
 Little St Bernard Pass
 San Bernardino Pass
 Souvenir Henri Desgrange

References

External links 

 
 
 
 
 
 
Le col du Grand Saint-Bernard dans le Tour de France 
Col du Grand-Saint-Bernard on Google Maps (Tour de France classic climbs)

Italy–Switzerland border crossings
Mountain passes of Switzerland
Mountain passes of the Alps
Mountain passes of Valais
Mountain passes of Aosta Valley